Lars Sune Olsson (born 13 October 1932) is a retired Swedish cross-country skier. He was part of the Swedish 4 × 10 km relay team that won the 1962 world title and finished fourth at the 1960 Olympics; individually he placed 16th over 15 km at the 1964 Games.

Cross-country skiing results

Olympic Games

World Championships
 1 medal – (1 gold)

References

Swedish male cross-country skiers
1932 births
Cross-country skiers at the 1960 Winter Olympics
Cross-country skiers at the 1964 Winter Olympics
Living people
FIS Nordic World Ski Championships medalists in cross-country skiing